The State University of Santa Cruz (UESC) is a public institution of higher education in Brazil, based in the city of Ilhéus, Bahia. Until the 1990s, it was the only university in the city.
As of 2020, the university offers 33 undergraduate courses and several graduate programs.

Courses

Humanities
 Administration
 Accounting
 Communications
 Economics
 Law
 Education
 Geography
 History
 Sociology
 Philosophy
 Psychology

Technology and Science 
 Computer Science
 Civil Engineering
 Mechanical Engineering
 Chemical Engineering
 Electrical Engineering
 Production Engineering
 Mathematics
 Chemistry
 Physics

Natural Sciences and Health 
 Agronomy
 Biomedical Sciences
 Pharmaceutical Sciences
 Nursing 
 Biological Sciences
 Physical Education
 Medicine
 Veterinary Medicine

Letters and Arts 
 English Literature
 Letters Vernacular
 Foreign Languages Applied to International Negotiations

References

External links
University's website

Educational institutions established in 1991
Universities and colleges in Bahia
1991 establishments in Brazil
State universities in Brazil